Glengall Bridge is a bridge in the Millwall Inner Dock, Isle of Dogs, London, England, near the Crossharbour DLR station. It is located in the London Borough of Tower Hamlets. The present Dutch-style double-leaf bascule bridge opened in 1990, resembling Langlois Bridge at Arles.The contract to manufacture the bridge across Millwall Dock was awarded to Butterley Engineering Company Ltd; of Ripley, Derbyshire.

The name derives from Glengall Grove which used to extend from West Ferry Road to Manchester Road with a bridge over Millwall Dock at exactly the same spot.

In The World Is Not Enough, James Bond's boat cruises underneath the bridge in the famous water chase scene.

References

Bridges in London
Millwall